The Northern India Championshipsor formally the Northern India Lawn Tennis Championship and, also known as the Northern India Tennis Championships was a combined men's and women's tennis tournament was founded as the North India Championship c. 1899. The first tournament was played at Delhi, India. The championships ran until 1970 before it was discontinued.

History
Tennis was introduced to India in 1880s by British Army and Civilian Officers. In 1899 the North India Championship was established and played at Delhi, India.. The championships were not staged during World War II and a few years after Indian Independence in 1947. 

The tournament was hosted at different cities in India and was also played on different surfaces, such as grass courts and clay courts. This tournament was also held in conjunction with the National Lawn Tennis Championships of India for the years 1960, 1962, 1964 and 1966. In 1969 and 1970 the event was also held in conjunction with the Punjab State Championships.

Locations and venues
The Northern India Championships were predominantly staged in New Delhi, over a number of years it was also held in other cities such as Amritsar and Lahore at the Cosmopolitan Club, Lahore and Lahore Gymkhana Club.

Championship finals

Mens singles
Incomplete roll included.

Womens singles
Incomplete roll included.

References

Clay court tennis tournaments
Grass court tennis tournaments
Defunct tennis tournaments in India
Defunct sports competitions in India
Recurring sporting events established in 1899
Recurring sporting events disestablished in 1982
1899 establishments in India
1970 disestablishments in India